Greek religion can refer to several things, including
Ancient Greek religion
Greek hero cult
Greco-Roman mysteries
Hellenistic religion
Platonic idealism
Greek Church (disambiguation)
Greek Orthodox Church
Greek Catholic Church
Religion in Greece
Hellenism (modern religion)

See also
Hellenism (disambiguation)